Daniel Pfister (born 7 December 1986 in Schwaz) is an Austrian luger who has competed since 2003. He won three medals at the FIL World Luge Championships with a silver (Mixed team: 2009 and two bronzes (men's singles: 2009, mixed team: 2007).

Pfister also won a bronze in the men's singles event at the FIL European Luge Championships 2010 in Sigulda. He also competed in three Winter Olympics, earning his best finish of sixth in the men's singles event at Vancouver in 2010.

References 
 FIL-Luge profile

External links 
 
 
 

1986 births
Living people
Austrian male lugers
Olympic lugers of Austria
Lugers at the 2006 Winter Olympics
Lugers at the 2010 Winter Olympics
Lugers at the 2014 Winter Olympics
People from Schwaz
Sportspeople from Tyrol (state)